Katagami is a city in Akita Prefecture, Japan.

Katagami may also refer to:

Ise-katagami, the Japanese craft of making paper stencils for dyeing textiles

People with the surname
, Japanese shogi player
, Japanese literary critic and academic

Japanese-language surnames